Michelson is a crater on the far side of the Moon. It lies along the northeastern outer rim of the huge walled plain Hertzsprung, and to the southwest of the crater Kolhörster.

This is a heavily eroded crater formation with multiple impacts along the rim edge and within the interior. The rim is roughly circular, but has been rendered relatively uneven due to these smaller craters. There are small craters across the interior floor, including impacts along the north, west and southeastern edges.

To the southeast of the outer rim is a crater chain that has been designated Catena Michelson. This feature is radial to the Mare Orientale impact basin, and passes near the outer rim of the crater Grachev.

Satellite craters
By convention these features are identified on lunar maps by placing the letter on the side of the crater midpoint that is closest to Michelson.

See also 

 Catena Michelson

References

 
 
 
 
 
 
 
 
 
 
 
 

Impact craters on the Moon